The Beauty Created LP is the first full-length release by singer-songwriter Jesse Boykins III, released in 2008.

Track listing 

All Songs Written by Jesse Boykins III (ASCAP)
Mastered by Ron Schaffer for Atlantic West Studios Brooklyn, NY
Art Design: DrWooArt

 Fever (Produced by Jeremy Most & Jesse Boykins III)
 Amorous (Produced by Anthony Coleman II, Jeremy Most, & Jesse Boykins III)
 Come to My Room (Produced by Steve Wyreman & Jesse Boykins III)
 Whispers (Produced by Steve Wyreman & Jesse Boykins III)
 Shine (Produced by Steve Wyreman, Jesse Boykins III & Hasan Insane)
 Trust (Produced by Basil Wajdowicz, Rene Del Fiero & Jesse Boykins III)
 Victoria (Produced by Marion Ross III & Jesse Boykins III)
 Pantyhose (Produced by Marion Ross III & Jesse Boykins III)
 Itis (Produced by Steve Mckie, Tone Whitfield & Jesse Boykins III)
 SunStar (Produced by Steve Wyreman & Jesse Boykins III)
 Loopy (Produced by Hadyn Blatt for Phantom Lover)
 Connected (Produced by Afta- 1)
 Chanel (Produced by Hadyn Blatt for Phantom Lover & Jesse Boykins III)
 Be All Truth (Produced by Steve Wyreman & Jesse Boykins III)
Tabloids (Machine Drum Remix) Bonus Track (ASCAP)
Tabloids (Melo-X House Remix) Bonus Track (ASCAP)

 NBC Bay Area on The Beauty Created

References 

 http://www.itunes.com/jesseboykinsiii

2008 albums
Jesse Boykins III albums